Cirrus is a high-rise cooperative apartment building in Helsinki, the capital of Finland. Cirrus is the fifth tallest building in Finland with a height of 86 meters (282 feet). The building, which is located in Vuosaari in East Helsinki, has 28 floors (including two underground ones) and 140 apartments. The proposal for this building originally included a public observation terrace and cafe, but they were never built.

The building was designed by the Finnish architect company YIT Group and construction commenced in early 2005. The building reached its final height on 15 March 2006.

The roof was part of the setting of the music video of Finnish rock band Poets of the Fall's 2010 single Dreaming Wide Awake.

References

See also
 List of tallest buildings in Finland

Buildings and structures in Helsinki
Housing cooperatives in Finland
Buildings and structures completed in 2006
Vuosaari
Skyscrapers in Finland
Residential skyscrapers